Crieff was a junction railway station at Crieff, Perth and Kinross, Scotland. It was where the Crieff Junction Railway, Crieff & Methven Railway and the Comrie, St Fillans & Lochearnhead Railway met.

The first terminus in Crieff was opened in 1856 as the terminus of the line from Crieff Junction, later rebuilt as Gleneagles Station. In 1866 the construction of a further line out to Methven meant that there was now a connection all the way to Perth. This station closed when a replacement station was built immediately to the north of it, the old station being repurposed as the goods yard for the new station.

The new station was a large station built to the specifications of the Caledonian Railway with two platforms and three tracks which ran through the station with the central track being a goods line. It had a signal box at either end, the western one controlling the route to Comrie and the larger, eastern box controlling access to the goods yard, the locomotive sheds and the tracks to Gleneagles and Perth. Passenger services to Perth and beyond Comrie to Balquidder ceased in 1951 but the station remained open to goods and for the stub to Comrie plus the Gleneagles line.

The station closed to passengers on 6 July 1964 with the closure of the lines to Comrie and Gleneagles. Freight continued on the Almond Valley line until September 1967 and the first Crieff Station continued to be used as a goods yard until then.

The site of the station is now occupied by the Crieff Community Hospital while the former goods yard now houses the Crieff Medical Centre.  Immediately west of the station site was a shallow cutting which was filled in during the 1980s to create a large car park and an adjacent supermarket.

References

External links
RAILSCOT on Crieff Junction Railway

Disused railway stations in Perth and Kinross
Beeching closures in Scotland
Railway stations in Great Britain opened in 1856
Railway stations in Great Britain closed in 1964
Former Caledonian Railway stations
Crieff